Dover Township is a township in Pocahontas County, Iowa, USA.

History
Dover Township was organized in 1870.

References

Townships in Pocahontas County, Iowa
Townships in Iowa